Marlon Moore (born September 3, 1987) is a former American football wide receiver. Moore was signed by the Miami Dolphins as an undrafted free agent in 2010. Moore has also played for the San Francisco 49ers. He played college football at Fresno State.

Early years
Moore was born in Sacramento, California, and attended Sacramento (CA) Natomas high school where he excelled in football. He then committed to Fresno State where he finished his college career.

Professional career

Miami Dolphins
Having gone undrafted in the 2009 NFL Draft, Moore signed with the Miami Dolphins as an undrafted free agent. Moore, who is known for his agility and quickness, was utilized primarily in special teams and a reserve receiver. Moore had a career highlight 37-yard reception from Matt Moore during the 2011 season. Moore had finished his career with the Dolphins with 12 receptions for 244 yards and 2 touchdowns, averaging 20.3 yards per reception. Moore was an unrestricted free agent at the conclusion of the 2012 season.

San Francisco 49ers
On March 19, 2013, it was announced that Moore had signed a one-year deal with the San Francisco 49ers. He was released in October 2013 due to Mario Manningham's return to the team's active roster after week 7.

Miami Dolphins (Second Stint)
Moore re-signed with the Dolphins on November 4, 2013 to a one-year contract, one week after getting released by the 49ers.  He appeared in the team's last eight games, catching six passes as a reserve wide receiver, and again returned to his role as a special teams ace for the club.

Cleveland Browns
Moore signed with the Cleveland Browns on July 28, 2014. On September 3, 2016, he was released by the Browns.

References

External links
Miami Dolphins bio
Fresno State Bulldogs bio
Ex-49er Marlon Moore is back with the Dolphins

1987 births
Living people
American football wide receivers
Fresno State Bulldogs football players
Miami Dolphins players
San Francisco 49ers players
Cleveland Browns players